Yemi Akinyemi Dele (born 4 November 1981) is a Czech choreographer, art director, performer, correspondent and artist. In December 2022, he was officially selected as one of eight dearMoon crew members. He will be aboard the first ever civilian lunar space mission in the history of mankind.

Life and career 
Yemi was born in Liberec to a Nigerian father and a Czech mother. Yemi's father studied at the University of Economics, Prague. When Yemi was four years old, his father visited his parents in Nigeria, however he was arrested as part of an armed coup and could not return to Czech Republic for another 18 years. Yemi's mother remarried and Yemi grew up with a stepfather. After a few years, Yemi contacted his father again and now he lives with his whole family in Prague.

Yemi identifies as a queer man and advocates for the advancement of LGBTQ+ rights worldwide.

Career 
At the age of sixteen, Yemi moved to Prague for education and work. Soon, he began to teach dance in the Netherlands and Sweden and study Street dance in Los Angeles at MaDonna Grimes, a Hollywood dance school.

In 1999, Yemi returned to Prague, Czech Republic where he founded JAD Dance Company (JAD DC), a Czech and international team of dancers and choreographers. Yemi's works and performances have been well received in many cities around the world including Tokyo, London, Barcelona, Bombay, Los Angeles, Shanghai, Paris and New York.

With his interest in art, Yemi completed a degree at the Central European Advertising Art Institute, focusing on art directing and copyrighting.

Yemi also produced the first music video of Ben Cristovao and the music video of American rapper Turbo T. Double's song ATOMS.

According to Yemi, his vision or driving force was "to showcase modern dance choreography throughout the world that reflects current global feelings, emotions and consciousness". He strives to use dance expression to represent the human connection with a fusion of cultures and societies, as well as explore individual authenticity and one's roots.

JAD Dance Company 
Through JAD Dance Company (JAD DC), he was able to share the unique dance styles, which were previously unavailable and unknown, in the post-communist Czech Republic and to its dancers. Since its inception, it has attracted accomplished dancers from all over the Czech Republic & Slovakia with its reputation for representing a truly unique and high caliber of dance techniques.  He focused at his original dance style called Street FUSION. One notable work of JAD Dance Company is their collaboration with Kanye West as his principal (main) dancers in his 'Runaway (2010 film). Later on, Yemi eventually also set up Dance Academy Prague (DAP); in which people from diverse age groups and ability/experience in dance can come and learn various dance styles such as Hip-Hop, Modern Ballet, Jazz, Contemporary, MTV style, Dance Hall etc. from choreographers with diverse nationalities (up to date, Yemi teaches Street FUSHION in DAP). After various training/practice session, some students at DAP are given the opportunity to perform live in the streets of Prague, in stages for various corporations and occasions as well as in local and international competitions.

Work with Kanye West 
In 2010, hip-hop rapper Kanye West hired Yemi to choreograph ballet inspired sequence in the Runaway of the "Beautiful Dark Twisted Fantasy" album. The piece was well received and Kanye West commissioned Yemi to create choreography for West's Runaway performance in Los Angeles for VMA's 2010 and for Saturday Night Life performance of "Power" and "Runaway". The collaboration continued with Yemi creating choreography for other songs of the "Beautiful Dark Twisted Fantasy" album for Kanye West's global tour. West tweeted about Yemi. Yemi was also quoted in GQ Magazine regarding Kanye West

Work with Charlie Straight 
The following year 2011, Charlie Straight, a Czech indie-rock band, asked Yemi to direct their music video, "School Beauty Queen", which was later awarded the Music Video of the Year in 2011 by MTV Czech.

Other works 
As a performer, Yemi has acted in several foreign productions such as Chronicles of Narnia II - Prince Caspian, Red Tails, Unfaithful Klara (Italy, 2009) and the Czech series, Ordinace V Růžové Zahradě. Yemi also performed and led choreographies of six series of the most popular TV show on TV Nova - Tvoje tvář má známý hlas.

Yemi was also the first Czech correspondent for MTV Europe and became the host of a popular Czech TV show, ESO.

As a dancer, he performed in a principal role in the original Czech musical, Monte Cristo for two years.

In 2013 Yemi released his debut maxi-single Equals.

In 2014, Yemi was chosen by the readers of MF Dnes among the 24 most influential personalities in the Czech Republic.

Since 2017, Yemi is one of the first Czech ambassadors of sustainable development goals and one of the three Goodwill Ambassadors for Ministry of foreign affairs in Czech Republic.

In February 2019, American TV station CBS began to broadcast new talent show The World's Best and Yemi was chosen to be among 50 professional judges from all around the world.

In 2019, Yemi starred in Apple's Life on iPad iPad Pro worldwide advertising commercial campaign.

As a speaker, he has presented a TEDx talk on his original approach to the millennial generation.

He is also the ambassador of Sustainable development Goals under the UN for the Czech Republic and was appointed as Czech Goodwill Ambassador by Minister of Foreign Affairs in 2019.

Yemi is also an electromobility ambassador for Mercedes Benz, Czechia.

In May 2020, he became the first Czech inductee in the Henry Crown Fellowship Network at the Aspen Institute USA. He also earned program's scholarship.

In 2021, Yemi submitted his application for “dearMoon”—the first civilian lunar orbital mission. Funded by Japanese entrepreneur Yusaku Maezawa, who invited eight creatives to join him on a six-day flight around the Moon, the mission will be operated by SpaceX's newest rocket. In Spring 2022, Yemi was accepted into the pre-final group of 20 selected participants and is awaiting the final call.

In 2021, Yemi founded Moonshot Platform Inc., a U.S.-based 501(c)(3) non-profit organization previously operating from Europe, whose mission is to seek and accelerate emerging leaders and their organizations around the world who work on solutions to the 21st Century Grand Challenges & SDGs focused innovations. The platform, supported by former U.S. Secretary Madeleine Albright, hosted five conferences across Europe and the U.S. in 2021 with over 650 C-level change-makers, 60 international speakers and reached over three million people.

Spaceflight
After applying, in 2022, Yemi was selected to participate in a lunar spaceflight as part of the DearMoon project crew. The mission is scheduled to occur in 2023 aboard the SpaceX Starship.

Choreography 
 "Runaway" – "Runaway Movie"  (2010)
 Saturday Night Live – "Runaway" & "Power" performances for Kanye West (2010)
 MTV Video Music Awards (2010)
 Coachella Festival (2011) 
 Mawazine Festival (2011)
 Splendour In The Grass Festival (2011)
 European Festival Tour (Lisbon, Portugal / Herdforshire, UK / Bergen, Norway / Oslo, Norway / Copenhagen, Denmark / Gothenburg, Sweden / Helsinki, Finland / Krakow, Poland) (2011)
 XBOX Modern Warfare 3 Convention (Los Angeles, CA); Essence Festival (New Orleans, LA) (2011)
 SummerFest Festival (2011)
 Austin City Limits Music Festival (2011)
 Big Day Out Australian Tour (2012)

Direction and production 
 Internet Viral Campaign – for NIC.CZ
 Music Video Ben Cristovao – "Give Me Some More"
 Music Video Charlie Straight – "School Beauty Queen"
 Music Video for MISTA – "Never Hide"
 Music Video Kanye West – "Lost In The World"
 Music Video for Polica – "Wandering Star"

Awards 
 Best Media Campaign Best usage of social networks & viral marketing in the country by PIAF – campaign "Doublers"
 Best Music Video MTV Czech Charlie Straight – "School Beauty Queen" (2011)
 24 Most Influential People in Czech Republic voted by MF Dnes, most respected Czech Daily Press (2010)
 Choreography for Saturday Night Live Kanye West performance of Power and Runaway - the act was named as best live act in history of the SNL TV show – claimed by SNL senior producer
 The Best Event Award by the CzechEvents Awards - JAD Productions (2014, 2015, 2016)
 World's Best Event – JAD Productions (2015, 2016, 2018)
 International awards for digital campaigns adidas Originals and Mercedes Benz - JAD Productions
 London Loop Awards – winner of B2P category, winner of Best use of Web & Social media

References

External links 
 
 Yemi A.D. at YouTube
 Yemi A.D. - Official Website

1981 births
Living people
Czech choreographers
Czech people of Nigerian descent
Czech art directors
Czech LGBT artists
Artists from Liberec
Czech cosmonauts and astronauts